Dimerocrinites is an extinct genus of crinoids that lived from the Silurian to the Early Devonian of Australia and North America.

Sources
 Fossils (Smithsonian Handbooks) by David Ward (Page 166)

External links
Dimerocrinites in the Paleobiology Database

Diplobathrida
Prehistoric crinoid genera
Silurian crinoids
Devonian crinoids
Devonian echinoderms of Oceania
Devonian echinoderms of North America
Silurian first appearances
Early Devonian genus extinctions
Paleozoic life of Ontario